Petchchaiyapruek Football Club (Thai : สโมสรฟุตบอล เพชรชัยพฤกษ์), is a Thai football club based in Bangkok, Thailand. The club is currently playing in the 2018 Thailand Amateur League Bangkok Metropolitan Region.

Record

References
 104 ทีมร่วมชิงชัย! แบโผผลจับสลาก ดิวิชั่น 3 ฤดูกาล 2016
 http://www.thailandsusu.com/webboard/index.php?topic=242930.0

External links
 Facebookpage

Association football clubs established in 2011
Football clubs in Bangkok
Sport in Bangkok
2011 establishments in Thailand